Emmalocera anerastica is a species of snout moth in the genus Emmalocera. It was described by Snellen in 1880, and is known from India, the Nicobar islands, Singapore, Sumatra, Borneo, the Philippines, Taiwan, Spain and North Africa.

References

Moths described in 1880
Emmalocera